The 1984 Mississippi Valley State Delta Devils team represented the Mississippi Valley State University as a member of the Southwestern Athletic Conference (SWAC) during the 1984 NCAA Division I-AA football season. Led by fifth-year head coach Archie Cooley, the Delta Devils played their home games at Magnolia Stadium—now known as Rice–Totten Stadium—in Itta Bena, Mississippi. Mississippi Valley finished the season with an overall record of 9–2 and a mark of 6–1 in conference play, placing second in the SWAC. The team qualified for the NCAA Division I-AA playoffs, losing to Louisiana Tech in the first round. With an offense led by quarterback Willie Totten and wide receiver Jerry Rice, the Delta Devils scored 628 points on the season, averaging more than 57 points per game.

Schedule

Individual accomplishments
As a senior in 1984, Jerry Rice broke his own NCAA Division I-AA records for receptions (112) and receiving yards (1,845). His 27 touchdown receptions in that 1984 season set the NCAA mark for all divisions. Rice caught 17 passes for 199 yards against , 17 for 294 against , and 15 for 285 against , in the first win for Mississippi Valley over the Tigers since 1954. He scored five touchdowns twice that year. Rice was named to every 1984 College Football All-America Team, including the Associated Press squad, and finished ninth in Heisman Trophy balloting. In the Blue–Gray Football Classic all-star game played on Christmas Day, he earned MVP honors.

Rice finished his college career with 301 catches for 4,693 yards and 50 touchdowns. His NCAA record for total career touchdown receptions stood until October 7, 2006, when University of New Hampshire wide receiver David Ball, recorded his 51st career receiving touchdown.

Team players in the NFL

 Willie Totten played for the Buffalo Bills in 1987.

References

Mississippi Valley State
Mississippi Valley State Delta Devils football seasons
Mississippi Valley State Delta Devils football